Betty's Bunch was a television drama/adventure series from New Zealand, produced in 1989. Aimed at a young audience, the story revolved around four foster kids living with Betty. Though things are not always easy financially for the family, they keep the spirit up. Things quickly become more difficult when they attract the attention of the two thieves Arthur and The Charmer. Soon afterwards, Betty is kidnapped and her foster children are forced to search for her, as well as avoid being separated by social services.

The series was repeated on New Zealand afternoon television in 1993 and screened in the UK on Channel Four.

The music and memorable theme tune was performed by Dave McArtney of Hello Sailor.

Cast and characters

Main 
 Maggie Kirkpatrick as Betty
 Sarah Ford as Megan
 Anthony Samuels as Mick
 Jessica Cardiff-Smith as Chrissie
 Clayton Spence as Billy
 Paul Chubb as Arthur "the Con" Quinter
 Ken Blackburn as the Charmer

Guest 
 Rena Owen as Shirley Gardner
 Ian Watkin as Sgt. Meadows
 Frank Whitten as Eagleton
 Tina Grenville as Amanda

Episodes

References

External links
  at South Pacific Pictures
 
 Betty's Bunch at Ngā Taonga Sound & Vision

1990 New Zealand television series debuts
1990 New Zealand television series endings
New Zealand children's television series
1990s New Zealand television series
1990 in New Zealand television
Television series by South Pacific Pictures
TVNZ 2 original programming